Amma Ammaayiyamma is a 1998 Indian Malayalam film, directed by Sandhya Mohan and produced by Somasekharan. The film stars Mukesh, Sukanya, Harishree Ashokan, Kaviyoor Ponnamma, Sukumari and Meera in the lead roles. The film has its musical score composed by S. P. Venkatesh and original songs by M. S. Viswanathan.

Synopsis
Saratha, a retired teacher has five children Prabhavati, Premachandran, Madhavi, Maya and Balachandran. Madhavi is married to Bharghavan and have a child. But Madhavi and Narayaniamma (Bhargavan's mother) always makes some small issues each other. Balachandran is a bachelor and doesn't have a job. Prabhavati marries Shekharankutty, a rich businessman and forgets her family relations. However, Shekharankutty decides to make her realize the importance of family relationships. On other hand, Premachandran marries Renuka,a rich woman. She makes nuisance in his family by her mother's order and made Prem out of the family. Maya marries Mohan. But Maya is very hurt by her mother-in-law upon dowry. Can anyone solve these problems?

Cast

Mukesh as Shekharankutty
Sukanya as Prabhavathy
Harishree Ashokan as Premachandran
Kaviyoor Ponnamma as Saratha Teacher 
Sukumari as Vishalakshi
Meera as Maya
Krishna Prasad as Balachandran
Innocent as Bharghavan
Priyanka Anoop as Madhavi
Vijayakumar as Reghu
Kanya Bharathi as Renuka
K. T. S. Padannayil as Grandfather
Jose Pellissery as Sanku
N. F. Varghese as Kaimal
T. S. Raju as Reghu's Father
Tony as Mohan 
Gayathri as Rekha
KPAC Lalitha as Shekarankutty's Aunt
Philomina as Narayaniamma
Usharani as Dhakshayani
Anju as Sulochana

Music
The original songs were composed by M. S. Viswanathan while the film score was composed by S. P. Venkatesh. The audio cassette had the 5 original songs featured in the film.

References

External links
  
 

1998 films
1990s Malayalam-language films
Films scored by M. S. Viswanathan
Films shot in Thrissur